Narayana Ramachandran is an Indian squash administrator & Triathlon Administrator who served as the President of WSF (World Squash Federation). He was elected on 2008, succeeding Jahangir Khan of Pakistan. 
He also served as 12th President of Indian Olympic Association (IOA) from 9 February 2014 to 14 December 2017. He is the brother of the former Chairman of BCCI and ICC, N Srinivasan.

See also
World Squash Federation
Indian Olympic Association

References

External links
Officers of the World Squash Federation
Indian Olympic Association website

Indian sports executives and administrators
Living people
People from Tamil Nadu
Year of birth missing (living people)
Recipients of the Rashtriya Khel Protsahan Puruskar